Serena and Venus Williams defeated Julie Halard-Decugis and Ai Sugiyama in the final, 6-3, 6-2 to win the ladies' doubles tennis title at the 2000 Wimbledon Championships. They became the first pair of sisters to win the title. It was their third major title in doubles, and the third component in an eventual career Golden Slam in doubles. The Williams sisters had only played three events thus far into the season, and only entered the draw via a wildcard.

Lindsay Davenport and Corina Morariu were the defending champions but did not compete.

Seeds

  Lisa Raymond /  Rennae Stubbs (semifinals)
 n/a
  Martina Hingis /  Mary Pierce (second round)
  Julie Halard-Decugis /  Ai Sugiyama (finals)
  Anna Kournikova /  Natasha Zvereva (semifinals)
  Virginia Ruano Pascual /  Paola Suárez (quarterfinals)
  Chanda Rubin /  Sandrine Testud (third round)
  Serena Williams /  Venus Williams (champions)
  Alexandra Fusai /  Nathalie Tauziat (second round)
  Conchita Martínez /  Patricia Tarabini (second round)
  Nicole Arendt /  Manon Bollegraf (second round)
  Irina Spîrlea /  Caroline Vis (third round)
  Kimberly Po /  Anne-Gaëlle Sidot (second round)
  Anke Huber /  Barbara Schett (third round)
  Laurence Courtois /  Elena Likhovtseva (first round)
  Tina Križan /  Katarina Srebotnik (first round)
  Liezel Horn /  Laura Montalvo (second round)

Qualifying

Draw

Finals

Top half

Section 1

Section 2

Bottom half

Section 3

Section 4

References

External links

2000 Wimbledon Championships on WTAtennis.com
2000 Wimbledon Championships – Women's draws and results at the International Tennis Federation

Women's Doubles
Wimbledon Championship by year – Women's doubles